Sung may refer to: 
Sung, Cambodia, commune in Samlout District, Battambang Province
Singing (past participle of the verb "to sing")

Chinese history
Song (state) (宋) (11th century BC – 286 BC), a state during the Spring and Autumn period, also transliterated as "Sung"
Liu Song Dynasty (宋) (420–479), a dynasty during the Southern and Northern Dynasties period, also transliterated as "Sung"
Song Dynasty (宋) (960–1279), a dynasty split into 2 eras, Northern Song and Southern Song, also transliterated as "Sung"

Surnames
Song (Chinese name)
Seong (Korean name)
Seung (Korean name)

See also
Song (disambiguation)
 Unsung (disambiguation)